The Astronomy and Astrophysics Review is a peer-reviewed scientific journal that is published quarterly by Springer-Verlag GmbH Germany, part of Springer_Nature. The editor-in-chief is Francesca Matteucci. The first issue was published in April 1989.

Scope
The journal publishes invited reviews on all areas of astronomy and astrophysics, including cosmic ray physics, studies in the solar system, astrobiology, developments in laboratory or particle physics directly relevant to astronomy, instrumentation, computational or statistical methods with specific astronomical applications, and other subjects relevant to astronomy and astrophysics.

Abstracting and indexing
This journal indexed in the following databases:

References

External links
 

Astronomy journals
Astrophysics journals
Quarterly journals
Springer Science+Business Media academic journals
Publications established in 1989
English-language journals